Thomas Ajamie (born June 25, 1960) is an American lawyer and the founder of the law firm Ajamie LLP.

Professional History

Ajamie worked as a trial lawyer at the law firm Baker Botts. During his tenure there, he successfully defended the second largest funeral and cemetery services company against a $4 billion hostile takeover bid by that industry’s largest company, SCI. In 1997, he left Baker Botts and founded the firm which is now known as Ajamie LLP.

In 2001, a New York Stock Exchange panel levied a $429 million fine, the largest in history at the time, against PaineWebber broker Enrique Perusquia. on behalf of Ajamie's clients.

In 2006, a New York Stock Exchange arbitration panel returned a $14.5 million penalty, the third largest ever at the time, against Prudential Equity Group on behalf of his clients.

In 2010, he won the largest civil RICO jury verdict in United States history, on behalf of his client ADT Security Services.

Ajamie served as outside counsel for the Houston Super Bowl Host Committee. He and his firm handled all compliance issues during the nearly two years leading up to Super Bowl LI in 2017

In 2020, his clients were awarded a $79 million settlement following a class action lawsuit against Wells Fargo & Company in federal court.

In 2010, He and  Bruce Kelly wrote the book Financial Serial Killers: Inside the World of Wall Street Money Hustlers, Swindlers, and Con Men. The second edition of Financial Serial Killers was released in paperback in 2014.

In 2016 amfAR’s board retained Ajamie to investigate a suspicious financial transaction involving Harvey Weinstein. Weinstein hired lawyer David Boies and law firm Gibson, Dunn & Crutcher, as well as Israeli firm Black Cube to block the investigation.

After members of the amfAR board had shared the report with the New York attorney general and members of the press, Ajamie was contacted by New York Times writers Jodi Kantor and Megan Twohey. In October 2017, Twohey and Kantor published their sexual misconduct piece on Weinstein. Ajamie’s Weinstein investigation is also featured in their New York Times bestseller She Said: Breaking the Sexual Harassment Story That Helped Ignite a Movement.

Awards and honors

Top 50 Litigation Trailblazers (The National Law Journal)
Plaintiffs’ Lawyers Trailblazers (The National Law Journal)
Litigation Star–Commercial (Benchmark Litigation, published by Euromoney Institutional Investor)

References 

American lawyers
1960 births
Living people